Dave Shalansky (born on October 28th) is an American actor born and raised in Rhode Island.

Early life and education 
Shalansky was born and raised in Warwick, Rhode Island. He earned a BFA in acting from Boston University.

Career 
After moving to New York City immediately following graduation, he became successful in television commercials and continued his acting career by working in the New York and regional theatre circuits. In 1997, he appeared in a production of Balm in Gilead. In 2003, Shalansky moved to Los Angeles, and began working steadily in television and film.

In October 2016, Shalansky was asked by friend John Krasinski to join the cast in a staged reading of the Oscar Award-winning screenplay Good Will Hunting. Shalansky joined Matt Damon, Ben Affleck, John Krasinski, Emily Blunt, Daveed Diggs, Tom McCarthy, Keegan-Michael Key, Margo Martindale and Harvey Weinstein at the Skirball Center for the Performing Arts in New York City.

In November 2016, Shalansky landed a recurring guest star role on Grey's Anatomy.

Personal life 
He currently lives in the New York City area with his wife Cassandra and daughter.

Filmography

Film

Television

References 

Living people
People from Warwick, Rhode Island
Boston University College of Fine Arts alumni
American male stage actors
American male television actors
Male actors from Rhode Island
20th-century American drummers
American male drummers
21st-century American drummers
20th-century American male musicians
21st-century American male musicians
1973 births